Testosterone is a naturally occurring male sex hormone. 

Testosterone may also refer to:

Medicine
 Testosterone (medication), the hormone used as a medication
 Testosterone (patch), a medical patch designed to treat female sexual dysfunction

Entertainment
 Testosterone (2003 film), American film
 Testosterone (novel), 2000 novel by James Robert Baker and the basis for the film
 Testosterone (2004 film), Greek film by Giorgos Panousopoulos
 Testosterone (2007 film), Polish film by Tomasz Konecki
 Testosterone, 2003 British television documentary produced by Helen Littleboy
 "Testosterone", 2002 episode of This American Life

Music
 Testosterone (Mustasch album) (2015)
 Testosterone, a 1995 album by Bill Davis
 Testosterone, a 1992 EP by Zonic Shockum
 "Testosterone", a 1995 song by Bush from "Comedown"
 "Testosterone", a 2016 song by the Descendents from  Hypercaffium Spazzinate

Other uses
 Testosterone, a horse that won the 2011 Prix de Royaumont
“Doom(2016)” -Nintendo Switch

See also